Slatina pri Dobjem is a small settlement east of Dobje pri Planini in the Municipality of Dobje in eastern Slovenia. The area is part of the traditional region of Styria and is now included with the rest of the municipality in the Savinja Statistical Region.

Name
The name of the settlement was changed from Slatina to Slatina pri Dobjem in 1953.

References

External links
Slatina pri Dobjem on Geopedia

Populated places in the Municipality of Dobje